Carima Louami (born 12 May 1979 in Tourcoing) is a track and field sprint athlete who competes internationally for France.

Louami represented France at the 2008 Summer Olympics in Beijing. She competed at the 4 × 100 metres relay together with Muriel Hurtis-Houairi, Myriam Soumaré and Lina Jacques-Sébastien. In their first round heat they did not finish and were eliminated due to a mistake with the baton exchange.

References

External links
 
 
 
 
 
 

1979 births
Living people
French female sprinters
Olympic athletes of France
Athletes (track and field) at the 2008 Summer Olympics
Sportspeople from Tourcoing
French sportspeople of Algerian descent
Mediterranean Games gold medalists for France
Mediterranean Games medalists in athletics
Athletes (track and field) at the 2005 Mediterranean Games
Olympic female sprinters
20th-century French women
21st-century French women